Henry George Liddell (6 February 1811– 18 January 1898) was dean (1855–1891) of Christ Church, Oxford, Vice-Chancellor of Oxford University (1870–1874), headmaster (1846–1855) of Westminster School (where a house is now named after him), author of A History of Rome (1855), and co-author (with Robert Scott) of the monumental work A Greek–English Lexicon, known as "Liddell and Scott", which is still widely used by students of Greek. Lewis Carroll wrote Alice's Adventures in Wonderland for Henry Liddell's daughter Alice.

Life
Liddell received his education at Charterhouse and Christ Church, Oxford. He gained a double first degree in 1833, then became a college tutor, and was ordained in 1838.

Liddell was Headmaster of Westminster School from 1846 to 1855. Meanwhile, his life work, the great lexicon (based on the German work of Franz Passow), which he and Robert Scott began as early as 1834, had made good progress, and the first edition of Liddell and Scott's Lexicon appeared in 1843. It immediately became the standard Greek–English dictionary, with the 8th edition published in 1897.

As Headmaster of Westminster Liddell enjoyed a period of great success, followed by trouble due to the outbreak of fever and cholera in the school. In 1855 he accepted the deanery of Christ Church, Oxford. In the same year he brought out his History of Ancient Rome and took a very active part in the first Oxford University Commission. His tall figure, fine presence and aristocratic mien were for many years associated with all that was characteristic of Oxford life. Coming just at the transition period when the "old Christ Church," which Pusey strove so hard to preserve, was inevitably becoming broader and more liberal, it was chiefly due to Liddell that necessary changes were effected with the minimum of friction.

In 1859 Liddell welcomed the then Prince of Wales when he matriculated at Christ Church, being the first holder of that title who had matriculated since Henry V. While Liddell was Dean of Christ Church, he arranged for the building of a new choir school and classrooms for the staff and pupils of Christ Church Cathedral School on its present site. Before then the school was housed within Christ Church itself.

In July 1846, Liddell married Lorina Reeve (1826–1910), with whom he had nine children including Alice Liddell (1852–1934) of Lewis Carroll fame.

In conjunction with Sir Henry Acland, Liddell did much to encourage the study of art at Oxford, and his taste and judgment gained him the admiration and friendship of Ruskin. In 1891, owing to advancing years, he resigned the deanery. The last years of his life were spent at Ascot, where he died on 18 January 1898. Two roads in Ascot, Liddell Way and Carroll Crescent honour the relationship between Henry Liddell and Lewis Carroll.

Liddell was an Oxford "character" in later years. He figures in contemporary undergraduate doggerel:

The Victorian journalist, George W. E. Russell (1853–1919), conveys something of Liddell's image:

Works
Henry George Liddell was the author of

 , and numerous editions of the same, including abridgments for student use, written with Robert Scott. 
 
 , excerpted from the Roman history.
 , excerpted from the Roman history and revised.

Family
His father was Henry Liddell, Rector of Easington (1787–1872), the younger son of Sir Henry Liddell, 5th Baronet (1749–1791) and the former Elizabeth Steele. His father's elder brother, Sir Thomas Liddell, 6th Baronet (1775–1855), was raised to the Peerage as Baron Ravensworth in 1821.

His mother was the former Charlotte Lyon (1785–1871), a daughter of Thomas Lyon (1741–1796) (who was the youngest son of the 8th Earl of Strathmore and Kinghorne) and the former Mary Wren (died 1811).

On 2 July 1846, Henry married Lorina Reeve (3 March 1826 – 25 June 1910). They were parents of ten children:

 Edward Henry Liddell – also known as Harry (6 September 1847 – 14 June 1911).
 Lorina Charlotte 'Ina' Liddell (11 May 1849 – 29 October 1930); married William Baillie Skene in 1874.
 James Arthur Charles Liddell (28 December 1850 – 27 November 1853).
 Alice Pleasance Liddell (4 May 1852 – 16 November 1934), for whom the story of the children's classic Alice's Adventures in Wonderland  was originally told.
 Edith Mary Liddell (Spring, 1854 – 26 June 1876).
 Rhoda Caroline Anne Liddell (1859 – 19 May 1949); she was appointed a Member of the Order of the British Empire (MBE) in 1920 for her orthopaedic work at Netley Red Cross Hospital.
 Albert Edward Arthur Liddell (1863 – 28 May 1863); he died in infancy.
 Violet Constance Liddell (10 March 1864 – 9 December 1927); like her sister appointed MBE in 1920 for orthopaedic work at Netley.
 Sir Frederick Francis Liddell (7 June 1865 – 19 March 1950): First Parliamentary Counsel and Ecclesiastical Commissioner.  His son, Maurice Arthur Liddell, married Alix Kerr OBE (May 1907 – 6 July 1981), British writer who contributed to the Guiding and Girl Scouting.
 Lionel Charles Liddell (22 May 1868 – 21 March 1942); he was British Consul to Lyons and Copenhagen.

See also
 Lewis Carroll
 Alice Liddell

Notes

References

External links

 Two portraits, National Portrait Gallery

1811 births
1898 deaths
People educated at Charterhouse School
Alumni of Christ Church, Oxford
Fellows of Christ Church, Oxford
Deans of Christ Church, Oxford
Head Masters of Westminster School
British classical scholars
British lexicographers
19th-century English Anglican priests
Vice-Chancellors of the University of Oxford
Presidents of the Girls' Day School Trust
White's Professors of Moral Philosophy
Burials at Christ Church Cathedral, Oxford
Classical scholars of the University of Oxford
Liddell family
19th-century lexicographers